The Marriage of the Virgin is a subject in Christian art depicting the marriage of the Virgin Mary and Saint Joseph.

Marriage of the Virgin may also refer to:

 Espousals of the Blessed Virgin Mary, a Christian feast observed on January 23
 Marriage of the Virgin (Giordano), c. 1688
 Marriage of the Virgin (Campin)
 Marriage of the Virgin (El Greco), 1603–1605
 The Marriage of the Virgin (Michelino da Besozzo), c. 1435
 Marriage of the Virgin (Perugino), 1504
 The Marriage of the Virgin (Raphael), 1504
 Marriage of the Virgin (Rosso Fiorentino), 1523